Pyotr Pyatrovich Kachura (Petr Kachuro; born 2 August 1972) is a Belarusian former footballer who played as a forward. Starting off with his home town club Dynamo Minsk he went on to have spells at Sheffield United in England and Chengdu Wuniu in China before returning to his homeland, playing for Minsk for a second spell and later for Sokol Saratov. Following his retirement he went on to have a spell as manager at Dinamo Minsk in 2006–07. Internationally, he made 29 appearances, scoring five goals for the Belarus national team.

During his time in England he used an Anglicised version of his name and was referred to as Petr or Peter Katchouro.

Club career
Kachura started his playing career at his hometown club FC Dinamo Minsk, the most successful team in Belarus having won the Belarusian Premier League a record seven times since it began in 1992. Kachura was part of the side which won the Belarusian Premier League in 1995.

In July 1996, Sheffield United signed Kachura for £650,000. He scored 14 goals in his first season as the Blades finished in fifth place in Division One and qualified for the Playoffs. However, the Blades lost 1–0 to Crystal Palace in the final at Wembley, with a last minute David Hopkin goal shattering United's promotion dream. Kachura was awarded for his performances by being given the 1996–97 player of the season award at Bramall Lane.

The following season he made just 16 appearances, due to injuries, as the Blades qualified for the playoffs once again by finishing in sixth place. This time they lost in the semi-finals, with Sunderland defeating the Blades 3–2 on aggregate, after the Blades had held a 2–1 lead going into the second leg. Kachura failed to score that season, but made amends in the next season, as he scored six goals in 16 appearances as the Blades failed to qualify for the playoffs by finishing in a disappointing eighth place, nine points from the playoffs. Kachura missed a large part of the season due to a punctured lung injury in the 4–0 home defeat to Sunderland.

His final season in England saw him score three goals in 30 appearances as the Blades woeful start condemned them to a 16th-place finish, as Neil Warnock replaced Adrian Heath as manager in early December and rescued the Blades from relegation.

In March 2000 Kachura was transferred to Chinese side Chengdu Wuniu on a free transfer. He stayed there for one season before re-joining his hometown club Dinamo Minsk in August 2000.

International career
Kachura made his debut for the Belarus national team on 25 May 1994, in a 3–1 loss against Ukraine in a friendly.

Coaching career
After Kachura retired from playing, Kachura became a football coach. His former club, FC Dinamo Minsk, appointed him in November 2006, but replaced him after the first match of the 2007 Belarusian Premier League season.

Career statistics
Scores and results list Belarus' goal tally first, score column indicates score after each Kachura goal.

Honours
Dinamo Minsk
Belarusian Premier League: 1993–94, 1994–95, 1995
Belarusian Cup: 1993–94

Individual
Belarusian Premier League top scorer: 1993–94
Sheffield United F.C. Player of the Year: 1997

References

1972 births
Living people
People from Orsha
Soviet footballers
Belarusian footballers
Belarusian expatriate footballers
Belarusian expatriate sportspeople in China
Belarusian expatriate sportspeople in Russia
Belarus international footballers
Expatriate footballers in China
Expatriate footballers in England
Expatriate footballers in Russia
FC Dinamo Minsk players
FC Dinamo-93 Minsk players
Sheffield United F.C. players
Chengdu Tiancheng F.C. players
FC Sokol Saratov players
Soviet Top League players
Belarusian Premier League players
Russian Premier League players
Belarusian football managers
Belarusian expatriate football managers
Expatriate football managers in Tajikistan
FC Dinamo Minsk managers
FC Neman Grodno managers
FC Lida managers
Association football forwards
Sportspeople from Vitebsk Region